Ayyār, (pl. ʿayyārūn; , pl. Ayyârân) refers to a person associated with a class of warriors in Iraq and Iran from the 9th to the 12th centuries. The word literally means vagabond. Ayyars were associated with futuwwa, or medieval Islamic organizations located in cities.

Emergence
'Ayyarun are believed to predate Islam, since they are said to have distinct Iranian customs, and they were active in regions corresponding to the territories of the Sasanian Empire. However, most of the writing about them centers on their activities in Baghdad from the 10th to the 12th centuries. Baghdad was ruled by the Buyids (945–1055) back then. They did many terrible things such as extorting taxes on roads and markets, burning wealthy quarters and markets, and looting the homes of the rich by night. For several years (1028–33), al-Burjumi and Ibn al-Mawsili, leaders of the 'ayyarun, ruled the city due to governmental instability.

Reputation
The 'ayyarun have been commonly called fighters, though these activities are highlighted during times of weak government and civil war, when their role as a military force most likely made them fight on multiple sides, angering many. During times of more stable government, their lawful activities decreased, and when the Seljuqs ruled in the 12th century, their activities almost ceased. The 'ayyarun also made war against much of Turks in reaction to social injustices.

Regional influence
Outside Baghdad, the 'ayyarun were closely allied with the middle class, and helped maintain the current order. The Saffarids (861-1003) of eastern Iran were in fact an 'ayyarun dynasty. They are thought by some historians to have contributed to the weakening of Baghdad, clearing the way for the horrific destruction of the city by the Mongols.

See also
Javānmardi
Samak-e Ayyar, ancient Persian story about an Ayyār named Samak

References

AYYĀR, Encyclopædia Iranica

External links
Library reference
Word definition
Primary Source reference
Newspaper article

Middle East
Military units and formations of the medieval Islamic world
Outlaws
Medieval history of Iran